WSQY-LD, virtual channel 51 (UHF digital channel 29), is a low-powered Daystar owned-and-operated television station licensed to Spartanburg, South Carolina, United States. The station is owned by the Daystar Television Network. WSQY-LD's transmitter is located at Paris Mountain State Park in northern Greenville County.

Digital channels
The station's digital signal is multiplexed:

References

SQY-LD
Television channels and stations established in 1999
1999 establishments in South Carolina
Daystar (TV network) affiliates
Low-power television stations in the United States